"Mr. Sandman" (or "Mister Sandman") is a popular song written by Pat Ballard and published in 1954. It was first recorded in May of that year by Vaughn Monroe & His Orchestra and later that year by the Chordettes and the Four Aces. The song's lyrics convey a request to "Mr. Sandman" to "bring me a dream" – the traditional association of the folkloric figure (but in this context the meaning of dream is more akin to 'dreamboat'). The pronoun used to refer to the desired dream is often changed depending on the sex of the singer or group performing the song, as the original sheet music publication, which includes male and female versions of the lyrics, intended.

Emmylou Harris' recording of the song was a hit in multiple countries in 1981. Other versions of the song have been produced by Chet Atkins (1954) and Bert Kaempfert (1968).

Background
Vaughn Monroe, with his orchestra, was the first to record the song in 1954. It was released as the B-side of "They Were Doin' the Mambo", on RCA Victor label as catalog number 20-5767 / 47-5767.  This record lacked the complex vocal harmonies found in many later versions of the song.

In December 1954, the song reached No. 1 on the Cash Box Top 50, in a tandem ranking of the versions by the Chordettes, the Four Aces, Buddy Morrow, Vaughn Monroe, Les Elgart, the Lancers, and the Song Singers, with the Chordettes and the Four Aces' versions marked as bestsellers. It also reached No. 1 on Cash Boxs chart of "The Nation's Top Ten Juke Box Tunes", in the same tandem ranking, and No. 1 on Cash Boxs chart of "The Ten Records Disk Jockeys Played Most This Week", with only the Chordettes version listed initially, but later in a tandem ranking of the Chordettes and the Four Aces' versions.

The song also reached No. 1 on Billboards "Honor Roll of Hits", with the Chordettes and the Four Aces' versions listed as best sellers, and was ranked No. 12 on Billboards ranking of "1955's Top Tunes" based on the Honor Roll of Hits.

The Chordettes version

The Chordettes' recording of the song was released on the Cadence Records label on both 78 RPM and 45 RPM formats. Cadence's founder, Archie Bleyer, was the orchestra conductor on the recording and provided a rhythmic beat on the recording, using his knees. Bleyer's voice is heard in the third verse, when he says the word "Yes?" The piano is played by Moe Wechsler. Liberace's name is mentioned for his "wavy hair", and a glissando (a flourish common in his music) immediately follows. Pagliacci is mentioned for having a lonely heart, which is a reference to the opera Pagliacci by Ruggero Leoncavallo.

In the United States, the Chordettes' single reached No. 1 on all three of Billboards popular music charts, and was ranked No. 9 in Cash Boxs ranking of "1955's Top Pop Records as Voted in the Cash Box Poll".

Chart performance

The Four Aces version

In 1954, the Four Aces released a version of the song, backed by the Jack Pleis Orchestra. The Four Aces' version was a top-ten hit in the United States, United Kingdom, and Flanders. The Four Aces' version was notably featured in the movie Back to the Future, when Marty first realizes he is in 1955.

Chart performance

Chet Atkins version
On November 17, 1954, Chet Atkins recorded an instrumental version during a four-song recording session at RCA Victor's Nashville recording studio. Atkins used the Ray Butts EchoSonic guitar amp on this recording, and was backed by celesta, piano, bass, and drums. Atkins' version was released as a single in January 1955. It was Atkins' first single to chart on Billboards country charts, and reached No. 15 on Billboards Country & Western Records chart of "Best Sellers in Stores" and No. 13 on Billboards Country & Western Records chart of "Most Played by Jockeys".

Atkins re-recorded "Mister Sandman" for his 1990 album The Magic of Chet Atkins.

Credits and personnel
Chet Atkins – Guitar
Bud Isaacs – Steel guitar
Marvin Hughes – Piano / Celeste
Ernie Newton – Bass
Buddy Harman – Drums
Stephen H. Sholes – Producer

Bert Kaempfert version
In 1968, Bert Kaempfert and His Orchestra released an instrumental version as a single and on the album My Way of Life. It reached No. 12 on Billboards Easy Listening chart, No. 14 on Record Worlds "Top Non-Rock" chart, No. 3 on Record Worlds chart of "Singles Coming Up", and No. 1 on Cash Boxs "Looking Ahead" chart of singles with potential of entering the Cash Box Top 100.

Emmylou Harris version

In January 1978, Emmylou Harris, Dolly Parton, and Linda Ronstadt recorded a version of the song for a planned trio album which was ultimately scrapped. (The three would eventually reunite and release the first of two Trio albums nearly a decade later in 1987). Harris included the trio recording of "Mr. Sandman" on her 1981 album Evangeline, though with the stipulation that it not be released as a single (given that Parton and Ronstadt both were affiliated with other record labels). However, when Harris later changed her mind and wanted to put the song out as a single, she rerecorded it, singing all three parts herself, and releasing it in 1981, under the title "Mister Sandman". The single reached number 10 on the Billboard Hot Country Singles chart, and number 37 on the Billboard Hot 100, making it Harris' only single to reach the top 40 on that chart.

Harris's single version did not appear on an album until the 1984 compilation Profile II: The Best of Emmylou Harris.

Credits and personnel
Evangeline version
Emmylou Harris – lead and backing vocals
Dolly Parton – backing vocals
Linda Ronstadt – backing vocals
James Burton – electric guitar
Brian Ahern – acoustic guitar
Glen D. Hardin – electric piano
Mike Bowden – bass
Hal Blaine – drums

Charts

Year-end charts

Other versions
Buddy Morrow and His Orchestra released a version in 1954, which reached No. 20 on Billboards chart of "Most Played by Jockeys".
In January 1955, a version by Max Bygraves reached No. 16 on the UK's New Musical Express chart.
The most successful recording of the song in the UK was by Dickie Valentine, which peaked at No. 5 on the New Musical Express chart in February 1955.
The Fleetwoods released a version in 1964, as a single and on the album Before and After. Their version reached No. 113 on Billboards Bubbling Under the Hot 100 chart and No. 19 on Cash Boxs "Looking Ahead" chart of singles with potential of entering the Cash Box Top 100.
Tommy O'Day released a version in 1978, which reached No. 96 on Billboards Hot Country Singles chart.
In 1996 the German power metal band Blind Guardian included a cover version of the song on their compilation album The Forgotten Tales. The song was released also as a CD maxi single. 
Bette Midler recorded the song for her 2014 album It's the Girls!.
In 2017 SYML released a cover, which was described as "an ominous and brooding song full of dark waves of emotion."
Ballard also rewrote the lyrics for Christmas use as "Mr. Santa". Singer Dorothy Collins released "Mr. Santa" in 1955, which reached No. 51 in Music Vendor. Amy Grant recorded a version included on the 1999 album A Christmas to Remember.
In 2021, political satirist Randy Rainbow did a parody of the song, changing it to "Mr. Biden (Bring My Vaccine)" about President Joe Biden's rollout of the COVID-19 vaccine.

References

External links

discogs.com The Chordettes on discogs.com

Songs about fictional male characters
Songs about dreams
1954 singles
1954 songs
1955 singles
1964 singles
1968 singles
1978 singles
1981 singles
1996 singles
Songs written by Pat Ballard
The Chordettes songs
The Four Aces songs
Chet Atkins songs
Max Bygraves songs
The Fleetwoods songs
Emmylou Harris songs
Blind Guardian songs
Bette Midler songs
Song recordings produced by Brian Ahern (producer)
Song recordings produced by Stephen H. Sholes
Number-one singles in the United States
Grammy Hall of Fame Award recipients
RCA Victor singles
Cadence Records singles
Decca Records singles
Mercury Records singles
His Master's Voice singles
Warner Records singles
Sandman